Caroline Elizabeth Doggart (born 1939), is a development economist and author.

Born in Utrecht, in the Netherlands, and educated at Girton College, Cambridge and Imperial College London, she began her career at the Economist Intelligence Unit. In 1970, she wrote Tax Havens and their Uses. The publication went on to become the Economist Group's bestselling publication, with 11 editions until 2005, translated into five languages. Reviewers described the book as "magisterial," "encyclopaedic," and a "classic."

Doggart has worked as a senior development economist for the World Bank in Malawi, Tanzania, Ghana, Ecuador, Botswana, Haiti, the Maldive Islands and Paraguay. In 1996, she wrote an influential article, From Reconstruction to Development in Europe and Japan.

Doggart is a board member of the Maria Montessori Training Organisation, a founder of the ICEA (International Consulting Economists' Association), and a director of the Pestalozzi Overseas Children's Trust.

She has contributed to The Financial Times, The Independent and The Economist.

Notes

References
From Reconstruction to Development in Europe and Japan by Caroline Doggart in The evolving role of the World Bank helping meet the challenge of development, K Sarwar Lateef, 1995, World Bank, 
Tax havens and their uses, C. Doggart, 1990, Economist Publications, 1990, 
Steuerparadiese und wie man sie nutzt : alles, was steuergestresste Herzen höher schlagen lässt, C. Doggart, 1990, Düsseldorf : Verl. Wirtschaft und Finanzen, 
Tax havens and their uses, C. Doggart, 1993, Economist Publications, 1990, 
Tax havens and their uses, C. Doggart, 1997, Economist Publications, 1990, 
Tax Havens and their Uses, C. Doggart, 2002, Economist Intelligence Unit, 
Environmental impacts of tourism in developing countries, C. Doggart & N.H. Doggart, Travel and Tourism Analyst, 1996
Industrial Development Opportunities in Botswana, C. Doggart, 1992, World Bank, 1992
From reconstruction to development in Europe and Japan, C. Doggart, 1995, World Bank (article inside Lateef, 1995, above)

1939 births
Living people
Alumni of Imperial College London
Alumni of Girton College, Cambridge
British economists
World Bank people
Writers from Utrecht (city)
Dutch officials of the United Nations